Grey Way, the Washdyke Wonder was a champion New Zealand Thoroughbred racehorse. He was foaled in Washdyke in 1970 near Timaru by Grey William out of Waybrooke who won the 'Broodmare of the Year' title in the 1977-78 season. Another famous racehorse foaled in this area was Phar Lap.

Achievements
He was horse of the year in 1973.  He was grey in colour and pure white in the later stages.  Grey Way was successful mainly at distances from 6 furlongs to a mile, i.e., a sprinter-miler, but he did win at longer distances.  He had a record of 51 wins and 27 seconds and 21 thirds from 164 starts. He raced from 2 to 10 years old, beating nearly every champion that New Zealand had to offer, including Show Gate. He also broke the Australasian record over 7 furlongs as a seven-year-old while carrying 60.5 kg. The rider in many of his races was Robert (Bob) Skelton.
He was the New Zealand equivalent to another great grey, Gunsynd. He was inducted into the New Zealand Racing Hall OF Fame in 2010.

Racing career

Originally thought of as a jumping prospect, Grey Way won four races as a two-year-old and added seven minor placings. He won a further seven races as a 3yo, also setting a track record for 1400m at Trentham Racecourse.

Early on as a four-year-old, he won two races, including another track record, set at Ashburton. He then went to Victoria, Australia where he struck unsuitable wet tracks, which he detested, but won the Chirnside Stakes at Caulfield in soft conditions. His final start there in the George Adams yielded a close fifth on a firm track, where rider Noel Harris lost his whip. Back in New Zealand, Grey Way ran a number of minor placings and looked awkward on right-handed tracks. He ended the season with three further wins, including a course-record at Riccarton.

As a five-year-old, he won 13 races including the Awapuni Gold Cup over 2000m, where he beat Oopik in track-record time. Other top gallopers he defeated that season included Copper Belt, Kiwi Can, Sind, Black Rod, Ajanta, Blue Blood, and Chrisarda. Going white with age, Grey Way won a number of races as a six-year-old. Among these were the defeat of mare Show Gate in the Stewards Hcp carrying 60 kg. He had several meetings with Copper Belt, and they beat each other on a number of occasions. At Ellerslie, he won the 1977 Easter Hcp over 1600m carrying 60.5 kg. He had a wall of horses in front of him and bulled through for rider Bob Skelton. Behind him were Tudor Light, Vice Regal, Kiwi Can, Verax, Patronize, and Shifnals Pride. His first win right-handed, and the Ellerslie crowd gave him a standing ovation.

Grey Way had lost some of his zip as a 7yo and 8yo. However, he won a South Island sprint under 62.5 kg and set an Australasian record for 1400m clocking 1:21.75 at Trenham, aged 7. More wins brought him up to 45 career victories. At 10, he brought up win numbers 50 and 51, and retired after knocking a leg at Trentham. His coat ended up almost snowy white.

Notable races
 December 1979 - Timaru Cup (Washdyke) beating Tuis Lass and Napiat 
 April 1977 - Easter Handicap beating Vice Regal and Kiwi Can
 March 1977 - North Island Challenge Stakes beating Shahbanou and March Legend 
 January 1977 - George Adams Handicap (Trentham) beating Fraxi and Caruba 
 November 1976 - Levin Gold Cup Stakes beating Copper Belt and Black Rod
 November 1976 - Steward’s Handicap (Riccarton) beating Show Gate and The Swagger 
 March 1976 - Awapuni Gold Cup beating Oopik and Prepak
 December 1975 - Manawatu Challenge Stakes beating Kiwi Can and Cream Puff
 November 1975 - Levin Cup (1600 WFA) beating Sind and Black Rod
 October 1974 - Chirnside Stakes (Caulfield) beating Coolalinga and Aurealis

See also 

 Thoroughbred racing in New Zealand
 Youtube video - Grey Way winning the Awapuni Gold Cup
 Youtube video - Grey Way winning the 1977 Easter Handicap

Reference list 

1970 racehorse births
Racehorses bred in New Zealand
Racehorses trained in New Zealand
New Zealand Racing Hall of Fame horses
Thoroughbred family 2-d